Submarina is an American chain of fast-food restaurants. Founded in 1977, the chain specializes in sub sandwiches.

History
Submarina was founded by Ron Vickers and Les Warfield of Reno, Nevada. They opened their first shop in Poway, California (a suburb of San Diego) and later opened the first official franchise shop in 1988.

Today there are 20 franchised Submarina locations with the headquarters in San Diego, California.

Restaurants established in 1977
Submarine sandwich restaurants
Fast-food franchises
Fast casual restaurants
Fast-food chains of the United States
Restaurants in California
Companies based in San Diego
Privately held companies based in California
Restaurant chains in the United States
1977 establishments in California